Jibril Muhammad Aminu (born August, 1939) is a professor of cardiology. He was Nigerian Ambassador to the USA (1999–2003) and was elected Senator for Adamawa Central constituency of Adamawa State, Nigeria, taking office on 29 May 2003. He is a member of the People's Democratic Party (PDP).

Birth and academic career
Aminu was born in August 1939. Studying medicine, he obtained an M.B.B.S from the University of Ibadan in 1965, and a PhD in Medicine from the Royal Post-Graduate Medical School, London in 1972.
 
He was appointed a Fellow of the Nigerian Academy of Science in 1972, a Fellow of the Royal College of Physicians, London in 1980 and a Fellow of the West African College of Physicians also in 1980.

He was made a Distinguished Fellow of the Nigerian Postgraduate Medical College in 2004.

Aminu was a Consultant in Medicine, Senior Lecturer and Sub-Dean, Clinical Studies at the University of Ibadan Medical School (1973–1975), and Executive Secretary of the National Universities Commission (1975–1979).

He was Visiting Professor of Medicine at Howard University College of Medicine in Washington DC (1979–1980) and Vice-Chancellor of the University of Maiduguri, 1980–1985. He was also Professor of Medicine at the University of Maiduguri (1979–1995).

Political career
Aminu held office as Federal Minister of Education and then Federal Minister of Petroleum and Mineral Resources (1989–1992).

While Petroleum Minister he was President of the African Petroleum Producers' Organization (1991) and President of the OPEC Conference (1991–1992).

He was elected a delegate to the National Constitutional Conference (1994–1995).

From 1999 to 2003, Aminu was Nigerian Ambassador to the United States of America.

Aminu was elected to the Senate for Adamawa Central in 2003 and reelected in 2007.
As a Senator Aminu was appointed to committees on Foreign Affairs, Education, Air Force and Health.
In a mid-term evaluation of Senators in May 2009, ThisDay said that he had not sponsored any bills, but had contributed to debates on some motions. He had managed the Foreign Affairs Committee well, and was very committed to the activities of the Committee on Education.

On 2 January 2010, Aminu was installed the "Bobaselu of The Source" by the Ooni of Ife, Oba Sijuwade.

Personal life
Jibril Aminu is twice married. His current wife is  Hajiya Fatima Bukar Mulima who gave him three children. His divorced wife is Hajiya Ladi Ahmed, who gave him six children. His sons Bashiru Aminu and Murtala Muhammad Aminu are economists and businessmen while his daughters work as lawyers (Nana Aminu) and dentists (Aminu Bello).

References

1939 births
Living people
Nigerian Muslims
Nigerian cardiologists
People from Adamawa State
Ambassadors of Nigeria to the United States
Peoples Democratic Party members of the Senate (Nigeria)
Education ministers of Nigeria
Federal ministers of Nigeria
University of Ibadan alumni
Academic staff of the University of Maiduguri
Howard University faculty
Nigerian expatriate academics in the United States
Fellows of the Nigerian Academy of Science
21st-century Nigerian politicians
Fellows of the African Academy of Sciences
Founder Fellows of the African Academy of Sciences